The Bhadala are an ethnic group found in Pakistan and India. They are found mainly in the Kutch District of Gujarat. In Pakistan, they are found mainly in Karachi.

Origin

The word Bhadala meant a hardworking businessman and sea rider in the Kutchi language, but now refers to a distinct community found along the coast of Kutch and Saurashtra. According to their traditions, they were originally settled in the town of Keti Bandar in Sindh, where members of the community are still said to be found. The community were said to be invited to settle in Kutch by the Mughal Emperor Shahjahan. Their original settlement was the village of Mota Salaya in Mandvi Taluka. The community are now settled in a number of villages in Mandvi Taluka such as Mandis Bhadala Phool and Juna Salaya. In the 18th Century, a large number of Bhadalas moved to Saurashtra, where they settled in the ports of Veraval, Jamnagar, Dwaraka and Porbandar. A second migration took place in the 19th Century, which saw many Bhadala move to Mombasa, Lamu and Daresalam in East Africa.  They were pioneers in the Asian settlement of East Africa. The community now speak Kutchi, while those in Saurashtra also speak Gujarati.

Present circumstances
The Bhadala are divided into a number of 32 clans, the main ones being the Dekla , Jadeja, Sap, Jethwa, Ruknani, Fatwani, mokha, Madwani, Kana, Babar, Bhopal, Thaim, Bholim, Turk, Madyar ,Bhojani, Vidhani, Chanaa, Sayani, Roomi, Juneja, Sodha, Sameja, Panjri, Palija, Koreja, Dosani, Bhatti, Ghohil, Saghani, Gunda and Siru. Many are names of well-known Sindhi tribes, and could point to a diverse origin of the community. But community boundaries are clear, and there is no intermarriage with neighbouring Muslim Maldhari communities like the Juneja, Royma and Ker. Each of their clans are of equal status and inter marry. The community have a well established caste association, the Muslim Bhadala Jamat, which is one of the oldest Muslim castes association in Gujarat. It has offices in Mombasa, Muscat, Dubai, Karachi (Keamari & Baba Island) and Keti Bandar, reflecting the widespread distribution of the community.

The Bhadala is still a seafaring community, and almost all the Dhow captains on the Dubai to India route are Bhadala. Many are also employed by the merchant navies of India and Pakistan. Generally each dhow crew is made up of close kinsmen. In Pakistan, the Bhadala owns a significant part of that countries fishing fleet. In India, the Bhadala often employ Muslim Machiyar or Hindu Kharwa on their fishing boats, while in Pakistan most of the crew is made up of ethnic Bengali Muslims.

The Bhadala are entirely Sunni, and follow the traditions of the other neighbouring Muslim communities.

References

Social groups of Pakistan
Sindhi tribes
Muslim communities of India
Social groups of Gujarat
Tribes of Kutch
Fishing communities in India
Fishing communities in Pakistan
Muslim communities of Gujarat
Sindhi tribes in India